Ballads is a compilation album released on December 20, 2000 by American R&B singer Mary J. Blige. It was released exclusively in Japan, which includes previously unreleased track "Overjoyed", a cover of Stevie Wonder.

Track listing

Certifications

External links
Various – New York Undercover (CD, Album)  
Various – Conception (CD, Album)
Various – Uptown MTV Unplugged (CD, Album)

References

Mary J. Blige albums
2000 compilation albums